The Hotchkiss School is a coeducational preparatory school in Lakeville, Connecticut, United States. Hotchkiss is a member of the Eight Schools Association and Ten Schools Admissions Organization. It is also a former member of the G30 Schools group.

History

In 1891, Maria Harrison Bissell Hotchkiss, with guidance from Yale president Timothy Dwight V, founded the school to prepare young men for Yale University. In 1892, The Hotchkiss School opened its doors to 50 male boarding students for $600. Hotchkiss's endowment also precipitated scholarship aid to deserving students. In 1974, the school became coeducational.

Number-one rule
George Van Santvoord (g. 1908, Yale 1912), a headmaster hailed as the Duke with an honorary dorm, claimed there was only one school rule: "Be a gentleman." In 1954, Time recognized in "Education: The Duke Steps Down", that "of all U.S. prep schools, few, if any, can beat the standards Hotchkiss has set."

International relations and diversity
Maria Hotchkiss was uninterested in establishing "a school for the pampered sons of rich gentlemen". The school has enrolled international students since 1896. In 1928, the school joined the English-Speaking Union and established the International Schoolboy Exchange. Established by the class of 1948, the Fund for Global Understanding enables student participation in summer service projects across the world. In 1953, Hotchkiss alumnus Eugene Van Voorhis (g. 1951, Yale '55, Yale Law ‘58) incorporated the Ulysses S. Grant Foundation program to assist minority New Haven students with boarding school admission, with Hotchkiss formally participating in addition to other recruitment initiatives from the 1960s onward, such as A Better Chance (ABC), Greater Opportunity (GO) summer program for inner-city students, and Prep for Prep to foster minority leaders.

The school has a 43% diverse student body (21% international students), offers a School Year Abroad program, and is a member of the Global Education Benchmark Group (GEBG), Round Square, and Confucius Institute International Division (Hanban). In 2010, Hotchkiss partnered with Peking University High School to establish its study abroad, international division called Dalton Academy.

Women admitted in 1974
in September 1974, 88 young women entered Hotchkiss as preps, lower-mids, upper-mids, and seniors. Since that beginning of coeducation the student body has grown to approximately a 50-50 gender balance in the student body.

Faculty sexual misconduct
In 2015, a male student sued the school, alleging that he had been raped and sexually harassed in "an environment of well-known and tolerated sexual assaults, sexually violent hazing, and pedophilia." In the suit, he said the dormitory master and instructor had drugged him and lured him to his quarters where he was raped.

In the lawsuit, he said he wrote an article for the student newspaper about the failure of the school to appropriately respond to complaints. The suit said the headmaster blocked publication and "conspired to prevent (the plaintiff) from informing the students, parents and the school community about the faculty member's sexual assault and his aberrant and predatory propensities and behavior."

As a result of this complaint and others, the school hired a law firm to investigate. The law firm interviewed more than 150 people and reviewed more than 200,000 pages of documents.

On August 16, 2018, the firm released its report, which found that seven former faculty members had abused students for years, yet school administrators took no action, even when made aware of the sexual misconduct. The report said that the abuse, stretching from 1969 through 1992, involved at least 16 students and consisted of intercourse and unnecessary "medical gynecological" exams.

A former headmaster who had been serving on the board of trustees resigned after cooperating with investigators. Board of trustee representatives said the information would be turned over to law enforcement officials.

Academics
Operating on a semester schedule, Hotchkiss offers a classical education, 224 courses, 7 foreign languages: which were Chinese, French, German, Greek, Latin, Russian, and Spanish; and study-abroad programs. In 1991, the New York Times recognized Hotchkiss' summer program as "Summer School for the Very Ambitious" and in 2011 as a private school leader in the farm-to-table movement, by incorporating agriculture into the curriculum since 2008. The year prior, the Deerfield Scroll featured that "many consider The Hotchkiss School to be the leader in environmental awareness among the top prep schools in the country."

In 2007, The Wall Street Journal listed Hotchkiss as among the schools with a higher success rate like Choate and Deerfield Academy, in matriculation to Harvard, Princeton, and six others, excluding Yale.

Extracurriculars

Athletics
Hotchkiss fields 19 interscholastic sports teams that compete in the Founders League, Eight Schools Athletic Council, New England Preparatory School Athletic Council (NEPSAC), and Interscholastic Sailing Association's New England Schools Sailing Association (NESSA) district. Its colors are Yale Blue and white, with the mascot being the bearcat.

In 1933, Samuel Gottscho photographed the Hotchkiss baseball team, which appears in the Library of Congress' Gottscho-Schleisner Collection.

Hotchkiss–Taft rivalry 

Despite Kent School's location in the same county, Hotchkiss and Taft School have a long-standing rivalry, where on the final Saturday of the fall sport season, called Taft Day at Hotchkiss and Hotchkiss Day at Taft, the two schools compete against each other in every sport. Similar boarding school traditions include the Andover–Exeter rivalry and Choate–Deerfield rivalry.

Clubs
Hotchkiss offers more than 65 clubs, including The Record, a biweekly, student-run newspaper circulated on campus and among alumni, The Mischianza yearbook, the Hotchkiss Chorus music ensemble, and extensive service organizations such as the St. Luke's Society. Other notable organizations include Callioupe, the all-girls a cappella group; Bluenotes, the all-boys a cappella group; the Hotchkiss Speech and Debate Team; and Food for Thought, the school's philosophy club. The school also hosts an annual student-run film festival, The Hotchkiss Film Festival, that attracts student filmmakers from all over the world to compete for prizes and a scholarship.

Campus

The school overlooks the Berkshires on a rural,  campus featuring 12 single-sex dorms (Baechle-Ayres, Buehler, Coy, Dana, Edelman, Flinn, Garland, Memorial, Tinker, Van Santvoord, Wieler, and Redlich, opened in 2016) and 1 all-gender dorm (Watson), two lakes, and one forest. The Main Building serves as the academic and social center, featuring 30 SmartBoard classrooms, the Edsel Ford Memorial Library with 87,000-volumes occupying 25,000 square feet, and dining halls.

An EPA Green Power Partner and Green Schools Ally, Hotchkiss requires all campus buildings to acquire LEED certification and was renovated to achieve the second highest, LEED Gold certification in 2008 and use 34% green power (ranked eighth largest, green K–12 school in 2009 by EPA), while upholding the Georgian architecture tradition from Bruce Price, Cass Gilbert, and Delano and Aldrich. The school renovation project earned Robert A.M. Stern Architects the 2010 Palladio Award, with Paul Rudolph and Butler Rogers Basket contributing elements of modern architecture.

Art facilities
In 2005, Hotchkiss opened the 715-seat Esther Eastman Music Center, equipped with a handmade Fazioli F308 piano, 12 Steinway pianos, 12 practice rooms, 3 ensemble practice rooms, a WKIS radio station, and Musical Instrument Digital Interface (MIDI) lab. Hotchkiss also has a 615-seat proscenium theater called Walker Auditorium.

Athletic facilities
In 2002, Hotchkiss opened the Forrest E. Mars Jr. Athletic Center, a 212,000 square-foot athletic center with multi-purpose playing surfaces, elevated indoor exercise track, the Andrew K. Dwyer and Martin Dwyer III Olympic Rink and Thomas Schmidt NHL Rink, natatorium with 10-lane pool and separate diving well, William C. Fowle Gymnasium (hardwood basketball court), Edward R. Davis Wrestling Room, Joseph Cullman Squash Courts featuring eight international squash courts, Ford Indoor Tennis Courts, John R. Chandler Jr. Fitness Center, locker rooms, and shower facilities.

The Hotchkiss Golf Course is a nine-hole golf course of approximately 3,000 yards, designed by Seth Raynor in 1924 and rated by Golf Digest as one of the 25 best nine-hole courses in America. Hotchkiss also has the Baker Complex, including synthetic Sprole Field and all-weather Hemmingway track; fifteen outdoor tennis courts; Joseph Cullman Paddle Tennis Courts; Centennial, Hoyt, Taylor, Downing, and Class of '49 Fields; Malkin Climbing Walls; Lake Wononscopomuc and a boathouse for sailing; three ponds; and extensive hiking trails.

Notable alumni

Notable faculty

Robert Osborn, art and philosophy, noted illustrator and cartoonist. Garry Trudeau the creator of the Doonesbury strip, has called Osborn "one of the very few masters of illustrative cartooning."

In popular culture

F. Scott Fitzgerald's book This Side of Paradise (1920) and short story "Six of One" (1932) mention the school several times.
In 1947, Time made a piece of Hotchkiss graffiti famous by publishing it twice: "In Lakeville, Conn., someone penciled in the Hotchkiss School lavatory: "Schuyler van Kilroy 3rd was here," a humorous, noble and generational-titled variation of the popular expression "Kilroy was here."
Archibald MacLeish's last interview (1982) in American Heritage magazine disclosed, "God, how I did not like Hotchkiss!"
Rosemary Wells' book Through the Hidden Door (1987) features the main character, Barney Penniman, who plans to attend Hotchkiss.
Bret Easton Ellis' book American Psycho (1991) features Patrick Bateman's fiancée, Evelyn, as a Hotchkiss graduate.
Joe Klein's book Primary Colors (1996) features the principal character, Henry Burton, as a Hotchkiss graduate frequently called "Hotchkiss".
Jeffrey Archer's book Sons of Fortune (2002) features the protagonist, Fletcher Davenport, as a Hotchkiss graduate.
Jay McInerney's short story "The Madonna of the Turkey Season" (2007) features a principal character, Aidan, as a Hotchkiss alumnus.
The Mad Men TV series (2007) character Glen Bishop attends Hotchkiss. In season 5, episode 12, "Commissions and Fees," he sneaks off campus to visit Sally Draper in New York.

References

External links

 

1891 establishments in Connecticut
Educational institutions established in 1891
Co-educational boarding schools
Boarding schools in Connecticut
Preparatory schools in Connecticut
Private high schools in Connecticut
Non-profit organizations based in Connecticut
Salisbury, Connecticut
Berkshires
Schools in Litchfield County, Connecticut
Cass Gilbert buildings
Georgian architecture in Connecticut
Modernist architecture in Connecticut
Leadership in Energy and Environmental Design gold certified buildings
Farms in Connecticut
Round Square schools
Selective schools
Semester schools
Bruce Price buildings